Felipe Ovono Ovono Mbang (born 26 July 1993) is an Equatorial Guinean professional footballer who plays as a goalkeeper for Ethiopian Premier League club Sidama Coffee SC and the Equatorial Guinea national team. He was part of the squad at the 2015 Africa Cup of Nations.

Early life
Ovono was born in Mongomo to Felipe Ovono and Josefina Mbang. His father died when he was very young and since then he was raised by his mother.

Career
Ovono started to play football in a club (Maria Auxiliadora) from the 3rd division and eventually the team got promoted to the second division, and after great performances in the 2nd division, he signed with Sony Elá Nguema of the first division. Ovono won several league titles with this team and consequently started to be part of the national team. In 2012, he was part of the team that played the African cup that was co-hosted by Equatorial Guinea and Gabon. He didn't play any minute in this competition and the team reached the quarter-finals where they were eliminated by the finalist Ivory Coast.

In 2013, Ovono signed with Deportivo Mongomo where he became the captain of the team. In his first season with Mongomo, he was honoured with the trophy of best goalkeeper of the league. In 2014, he played the African Cup hosted in Equatorial Guinea and this time he played all the matches of his team. The team ended 4th in the competition. During the competition, he realized great performances against big teams like Gabon, Tunisia, and Congo. And this attracted the attention of several teams from Europe and Africa.

In 2015, Ovono signed with Orlando Pirates from South Africa. He made his competitive debut for Orlando Pirates FC on 22 August 2015  and kept a clean sheet against AC Leopards on CAF Confederations Cup. He has since managed to earn a reputation amongst the Orlando Pirates faithful, as the goalkeeper who always drops and spills the ball straight back to the opposition, often leading to him conceding silly goals. The most recent occurrence was in the MTN 8 quarter final match against Bidvest Wits on 27 August 2016, where the Sea Robbers lost by 2 goals to 1.

In July 2017, Ovono signed for Sony Elá Nguema. After one year he joined the Ethiopian team Mekelle 70 enderta where he played the 2017-2018 season. They won the Ethiopian premier league 2018-2019 which allowed them to play the caf champions league qualifying round. They played against Equatorial Guinea team cano sport but where eventually eliminated after a loss 2-1 in the first leg and a draw 1-1 in the second leg.

On 6 August 2020, Ovono signed a two-year contract with Futuro Kings FC in his hometown of Mongomo.

Honours
Elá Nguema

 Equatoguinean Primera División: 2009, 2011, 2012

Deportivo Mongomo 

 Equatoguinean Cup: 2015

Orlando Pirates
 CAF Confederation Cup runners-up: 2015

References

External links
BBC Article

1993 births
Living people
People from Mongomo
Equatoguinean footballers
Association football goalkeepers
CD Elá Nguema players
Deportivo Mongomo players
Orlando Pirates F.C. players
Equatorial Guinea international footballers
2012 Africa Cup of Nations players
2015 Africa Cup of Nations players
Equatoguinean expatriate footballers
Equatoguinean expatriate sportspeople in South Africa
Expatriate soccer players in South Africa
Equatoguinean expatriate sportspeople in Ethiopia
Expatriate footballers in Ethiopia
Mekelle 70 Enderta F.C. players
Ethiopian Premier League players